The Cuckoo Clock (Italian: L'orologio a cucù) is a 1938 Italian historical mystery thriller film directed by Camillo Mastrocinque and starring Vittorio De Sica, Oretta Fiume and  Laura Solari. It was shot at the Cinecittà Studios in Rome and on location in Livorno. The film's sets were designed by artistic director Gino Brosio.

Synopsis
At the time of Napoleon's escape from Elba, a wealthy banker from Livorno hides his gold in a cuckoo clock to protect it from seizure by revolutionaries.

Cast
 Vittorio De Sica as 	Il capitano Ducci
 Oretta Fiume as 	Paolina
 Laura Solari as 	Elvira
 Lamberto Picasso as 	Il conte Scarabelli
 Ugo Ceseri as 	Barni, il fanatico bonapartista
 Gemma Bolognesi as 	La 'Nenna'
 Guglielmo Sinaz as 	Il banchiere Rosen
 Augusto Marcacci as Kreuss, l'ispettore di polizia
 Guglielmo Barnabò as 	Il sergente MacNeill
 Sergio Dani as 	Il lord ammiraglio
 Checco Rissone as Narciso 
 Giuseppe Pierozzi as 	Tonino

References

Bibliography 
 Aprà, Adriano. The Fabulous Thirties: Italian Cinema 1929-1944. Electa International, 1979.

External links 
 

1938 mystery films
1930s historical films
Italian historical films
Italian mystery films
1938 films
1930s Italian-language films
Films directed by Camillo Mastrocinque
Italian black-and-white films
Films shot at Cinecittà Studios
Metro-Goldwyn-Mayer films
Films set in the 1810s
Films set in Livorno
1930s Italian films